The 2011 Saint Francis Red Flash football team represented Saint Francis University in the 2011 NCAA Division I FCS football season. The Red Flash were led by second year head coach Chris Villarrial and played their home games at DeGol Field. They are a member of the Northeast Conference. They finished the season 2–9, 1–7 in NEC play to finish in last place.

Schedule

References

Saint Francis
Saint Francis Red Flash football seasons
Saint Francis Red Flash football